Mitchell County is a county in the U.S. state of Texas. As of the 2020 census, its population was 8,990. Its county seat is Colorado City.  The county was created in 1876 and organized in 1881. It is named for Asa and Eli Mitchell, two early settlers and soldiers in the Texas Revolution.

Geography
Mitchell County contains two reservoirs, Lake Colorado City and Lake Champion.

Major highways
  Interstate 20
  State Highway 163
  State Highway 208
  State Highway 350

Adjacent counties
 Scurry County (north)
 Fisher County (northeast)
 Nolan County (east)
 Coke County (southeast)
 Sterling County (south)
 Howard County (west)
 Borden County (northwest)

Demographics

Note: the US Census treats Hispanic/Latino as an ethnic category. This table excludes Latinos from the racial categories and assigns them to a separate category. Hispanics/Latinos can be of any race.

As of the census of 2000, 9,698 people, 2,837 households, and 1,997 families resided in the county.  The population density was 11 people per square mile (4/km2).  The 4,168 housing units averaged five per square mile (2/km2).  The racial makeup of the county was 74.52% White, 12.81% Black or African American, 0.41% Native American, 0.36% Asian, 0.02% Pacific Islander, 10.19% from other races, and 1.69% from two or more races; 31.03% of the population was Hispanic or Latino of any race.

Of the 2,837 households, 30.60% had children under the age of 18 living with them, 55.60% were married couples living together, 11.40% had a female householder with no husband present, and 29.60% were not families; 27.50% of all households were made up of individuals, and 15.50% had someone living alone who was 65 years of age or older.  The average household size was 2.48 and the average family size was 3.00.

In the county, the population was distributed as 19.80% under the age of 18, 11.50% from 18 to 24, 30.70% from 25 to 44, 22.90% from 45 to 64, and 15.10% who were 65 years of age or older.  The median age was 39 years. For every 100 females, there were 159.30 males.  For every 100 females age 18 and over, there were 174.40 males.

The median income for a household in the county was $25,399, and for a family was $31,481. Males had a median income of $23,750 versus $20,221 for females. The per capita income for the county was $14,043.  About 15.00% of families and 17.70% of the population were below the poverty line, including 22.90% of those under age 18 and 20.90% of those age 65 or over.

Communities

Cities
 Colorado City (county seat)
 Westbrook

Town
 Loraine

Census-designated place
 Lake Colorado City

Unincorporated communities
 Buford

Ghost towns
 Cuthbert
 Hyman
 Iatan
 Spade
 Valley View

Politics

See also

 National Register of Historic Places listings in Mitchell County, Texas
 Recorded Texas Historic Landmarks in Mitchell County

References

External links
 
 Mitchell County Texas Almanac Page
 Mitchell County Profile from the Texas Association of Counties

 
1881 establishments in Texas
Populated places established in 1881
Majority-minority counties in Texas